January 19 - Eastern Orthodox liturgical calendar - January 21.

All fixed commemorations below are observed on February 2 by Eastern Orthodox Churches on the Old Calendar.

For January 20th, Orthodox Churches on the Old Calendar commemorate the Saints listed on January 7.

Saints
 Martyrs Inna, Pinna, and Rimma (1st-2nd century), disciples of the Apostle Andrew in Scythia
 Martyr Eusebius (298)
 Venerable Euthymius the Great (473)
 Martyrs Bassus, Eusebius, Eutychius, and Basilides, at Nicomedia (303)
 Martyrs Thyrsus and Agnes (5th century)
 Saint Leo, Confessor and Emperor of the Eastern Roman Empire (474)
 Saint Peter the Customs Inspector of Constantinople (Peter of Constantinople) (c. 527-565)

Pre-Schism Western saints
 Martyr Anna at Rome
 Saint Fabian, Pope of Rome (250)
 Saint Sebastian, one of the most renowned of all the martyrs of Rome (c. 288)
 Saint Molagga (Molacus, Laicin), disciple of St David in Wales, founded a monastery in Fulachmhin (Fermoy), Ireland (655) 
 Saint Féchín (Fechinus), founded Fore Abbey at Meath (665)
 Saint Maurus, monk and Abbot of Classe in Ravenna (Basilica of Sant'Apollinare in Classe), and finally Bishop of Cesena (946).

Post-Schism Orthodox saints
 Venerable Laurence the Recluse (13th-14th century) of the Kiev Caves
 Venerable Euthymius the Silent, Schemamonk (14th century), of the Kiev Caves
 Saint Neophytus of Vatopedi monastery, Mt. Athos (14th century)(see also: January 21)
 Saint Euthymius, Patriarch of Turnovo (1402)
 Saint Euthymius of Syanzhema (Vologda) (1470)
 Venerable Euthymius of Arkhangelsk (1523)
 New Martyr Zachariah of Patrai in Morea (1782)
 Venerable Theodore Kuzmich of Tomsk (1864)

New martyrs and confessors
 New Hieromartyr Ioan Pettai, Estonian Martyr Presbyter.
 New Hieromartyr Paul Dobromyslov, Archpriest, of Ryazan (1940)
 Venerable Ekvtime (Kereselidze) the Confessor, of Georgia (1944)  (see also: February 2 - Greek)

Other commemorations
 Repose of Elder Gerasim, founder of Ascension Monastery, Irkutsk (1676)

Icon gallery

Notes

References

Sources
 January 20 / February 2. Orthodox Calendar (PRAVOSLAVIE.RU).
 February 2 / January 20. HOLY TRINITY RUSSIAN ORTHODOX CHURCH (A parish of the Patriarchate of Moscow).
 January 20. OCA - The Lives of the Saints.
 The Autonomous Orthodox Metropolia of Western Europe and the Americas (ROCOR). St. Hilarion Calendar of Saints for the year of our Lord 2004. St. Hilarion Press (Austin, TX). p. 9.
 January 20. Latin Saints of the Orthodox Patriarchate of Rome.
 The Roman Martyrology. Transl. by the Archbishop of Baltimore. Last Edition, According to the Copy Printed at Rome in 1914. Revised Edition, with the Imprimatur of His Eminence Cardinal Gibbons. Baltimore: John Murphy Company, 1916. pp. 20–21.
Greek Sources
 Great Synaxaristes:  20 ΙΑΝΟΥΑΡΙΟΥ. ΜΕΓΑΣ ΣΥΝΑΞΑΡΙΣΤΗΣ.
  Συναξαριστής. 20 Ιανουαρίου. ECCLESIA.GR. (H ΕΚΚΛΗΣΙΑ ΤΗΣ ΕΛΛΑΔΟΣ). 
Russian Sources
  2 февраля (20 января). Православная Энциклопедия под редакцией Патриарха Московского и всея Руси Кирилла (электронная версия). (Orthodox Encyclopedia - Pravenc.ru).
  20 января (ст.ст.) 2 февраля 2013 (нов. ст.). Русская Православная Церковь Отдел внешних церковных связей. (DECR).

January in the Eastern Orthodox calendar